Saul Matveyevich Abramzon (3 July 1905 in Dmitrovsk – 1 September 1977 in Leningrad) was a scientist-ethnographer, Turkologist, and specialist in Kyrgyz ethnology. Saul Abramzon graduated Leningrad University in the former USSR; he specialized in Turkic ethnology under Turkologists Samoilovich A.N. and S. E. Malov. Residing mostly in Leningrad, and working in Leningrad section of the Ethnography Institute, Saul Abramzon at the same time was a member of Kyrgyz scientific commission on history, began scientific ethnography of the Kyrgyz people, and directed the Kyrgyz State museum in the Kyrgyz capital, Frunze, at that time, working simultaneously as a deputy director of the Kyrgyz Scientific Research Institute, a scientific custodian the Kyrgyz State Historical Museum, and later a director of the Kyrgyz Ethnological Institute.

Almost all ethnographic expeditions carried out in Kyrgyzstan from 1926 to the 1960s were conducted under Saul Abramzon's leadership. In the process, Saul Abramzon brought up a generation of Kyrgyzstan expert ethnographers.

The range of scientific problems in which Abramzon was engaged was wide and covered almost all aspects of ethnography of the Kyrgyz people. The major theme of S. Abramzon research was ethnogenetic, historical and cultural connections of Kyrgyz with peoples of Middle Asia, Southern Siberia and the Central Asia, forms of Kyrgyz economic activities, material culture, ceremonies, customs and beliefs. Saul Abramzon left a huge scientific heritage: monographies, articles, reviews. They are stored in History Institute of Kyrgyzstan Academy of Sciences.

Publications
Абрамзон С.М., 1946 "Очерк культуры киргизского народа", Фрунзе, 1946
Абрамзон С.М., 1957, "К вопросу о патриархальной семье у кочевников Средней Азии", КСИЭ, Вып. 28.
Абрамзон С.М., 1971, "Киргизы и их этногенетические и культурные связи" Л.
Абрамзон С.М., 1973, "Очерки по истории хозяйства народов Средней Азии   и  Казахстана'"", Л.
Абрамзон С.М., 1977, "Фольклорные мотивы в киргизских преданиях генеалогического цикла. Фольклор и этнография: Связи фольклора с древними представлениями и обрядами"'', М.

1905 births
1977 deaths
People from Oryol Oblast
People from Dmitrovsky Uyezd (Oryol Governorate)
Russian Jews
Soviet Jews
Soviet ethnographers
Soviet historians
Turkologists